Super Over is a 2021 Indian Telugu-language crime thriller film written and directed by Praveen Varma. It is produced by Sudheer Varma through SAS Pictures production company. The film stars Naveen Chandra, Chandini Chowdary, Ajay, Praveen, and Rakendu Mouli. Music of the film was composed by Sunny M.R. Super Over premiered on 22 January 2021 on Aha.

Plot 
Kaasi (Naveen Chandra), Madhu (Chandini Chowdary) and Vasu (Rakendu Mouli) are childhood friends. Kaasi plans to go abroad but is cheated by travel consultant. The debt for his abroad plans, for which he put his house as collateral, have to be repaid. To earn money, Kaasi starts bets on cricket matches and he wins 1.7 crores. The following drama revolves around whether he collects his winnings and the consequences faced with his two friends.

Cast 

 Naveen Chandra as Kaasi
 Chandini Chowdary as Madhu
 Ajay as Ajay
 Praveen as Murali
 Rakendu Mouli as Vasu
 Harsha Chemudu as Bangaru Raju

Production 
Principal photography of the film began in late 2019 but was delayed due to COVID-19 pandemic. Director Praveen Varma died in a road accident in October 2020, after which producer Sudheer Varma managed the post-production.

Reception 
Sangeetha Devi writing for The Hindu stated: "Super Over doesn’t tap its potential of being an edge-of-the-seat thriller but is a reasonably packaged thriller." Sakshi critic Rentala Jayadeva appreciated the screenplay and direction for its novelty, in addition to the performances. Bhavenesh Chander of The New Indian Express felt that the narration tended to slow down as the film progressed. Reviewing the climax, Chander wrote, "Super overs are meant to yield a final result. However, Super Over ends with a cliff-hanger. The penultimate ball is also not fulfilling."

A reviewer from 123Telugu wrote, "On the whole, Super Over is a crime thriller that is decent with its narration part. Though the film has a few unconvincing episodes and foul language at regular intervals, considering the OTT release, the film ends up as a watchable fare for its thrills and stylized execution." Film Companion's Vishal Menon opined, "Look past a long initial stretch of amateur writing and you get a nighttime thriller that’s surprisingly engaging."

References

External links 
 
 Super Over on aha

2021 films
2021 crime thriller films
2020s Telugu-language films
Indian crime thriller films
Aha (streaming service) original films
Films set in Hyderabad, India
Films shot in Hyderabad, India